The 2019–20 Bradley Braves men's basketball team represented Bradley University during the 2019–20 NCAA Division I men's basketball season. The Braves, led by fifth-year head coach Brian Wardle, played their home games at Carver Arena in Peoria, Illinois as members of the Missouri Valley Conference. They finished the season 23–11, 11–7 in MVC play to finish in a tie for third place. They defeated Southern Illinois, Drake, and Valparaiso to be champions of the MVC tournament for the second consecutive year. They received the MVC's automatic bid to the NCAA Tournament, but the tournament was cancelled in an effort to reduce the spread of COVID-19.

Previous season
The Braves finished the 2018–19 season 20–15, 9–9 in MVC play to finish in a three-way tie for fifth place. As the No. 5 seed in the MVC tournament, they defeated Missouri State, Loyola, and Northern Iowa to win the tournament championship. As a result, they received the conference's automatic bid to the NCAA tournament as the No. 15 seed in the East region. There they lost to No. 2-seeded Michigan State in the first round.

Offseason

2019 recruiting class

Roster

Schedule and results

|-
! colspan="9" style=| Exhibition

|-
! colspan="9" style=|  Non-conference regular season

|-
!colspan=12 style=| Missouri Valley Conference regular season

|-
!colspan=9 style=| Missouri Valley tournament
|-

|-
!colspan=9 style=| NCAA tournament
|- style="background:#bbbbbb"
| style="text-align:center"|
| style="text-align:center"|
| 
| colspan=2 rowspan=1 style="text-align:center"|Cancelled due to the COVID-19 pandemic
| style="text-align:center"|
|-

Source

References

2018-19
2019–20 Missouri Valley Conference men's basketball season
2020 in sports in Illinois
2019 in sports in Illinois